Michael Colgan (died 22 June 1953) was an Irish independent politician and trade union official. He was a member of Seanad Éireann from 1943 to 1944 and from 1948 to 1953. He was first elected to the 4th Seanad in 1943 by the Labour Panel.

He stood unsuccessfully for Dáil Éireann as an independent candidate for the Dublin North-East constituency at the 1944 general election, and also lost his seat at the 1944 Seanad election. He was re-elected to the Seanad in 1948 and in 1951 again by the Labour Panel. He died in office in June 1953.

References

Year of birth missing
1953 deaths
Independent members of Seanad Éireann
Irish trade unionists
Members of the 4th Seanad
Members of the 6th Seanad
Members of the 7th Seanad
Politicians from County Dublin